Dhanapala Piyadasa Attygalle  was a Ceylonese lawyer and politician. A Proctor by profession, he served as Member of Parliament for Ratnapura.

He married Millicent Kularatna. They had three sons, Athula Kularatne Attygalle, member of parliament for Ratnapura district, Samitha Attygalle, member of the Sabaragamuwa Provincial Council and Dr Uthpala Attygalle, Consultant judicial medical officer.

References

Ceylonese proctors
Members of the 6th Parliament of Ceylon
People from Ratnapura District
Sinhalese lawyers
Sinhalese politicians
United National Party politicians
People from British Ceylon
Year of birth missing
Year of death missing